Scott B. Ransom is a Partner in the Health & Life Sciences Advisory at Oliver Wyman.

Biography

Partner in the Health Industries Advisory at PwC|Strategy&; Managing Director in the Healthcare Consulting Practice at Navigant Consulting (NYSE: NCI) where he led the Strategic Solutions Business Unit and Academic Medical Center practice; and, Senior Expert and Leader of the Southern Region of the Healthcare Systems and Services payor/provider practice with McKinsey & Company;
President and CEO of the University of North Texas Health Science Center for 7 years where he simultaneously served as Vice Chancellor for Health Affairs for the UNT System and Professor in Obstetrics, Gynecology, Health Management and Policy;
Tenured Professor in Obstetrics, Gynecology, Health Management and Policy where he served as the founding Director of the Program for Health Improvement and Leadership Development at the University of Michigan as well as Director of Women's Health and a Research Scientist in the Center for Practice Management and Outcomes Research at the Department of Veterans Affairs Medical Center in Ann Arbor.
Senior Vice President/Chief Quality Officer, hospital Vice President for Medical Affairs, Regional Chief Medical Officer, Clinical Director of Clinical Resource Management and Information Systems, and other roles at the Detroit Medical Center where he simultaneously served as an Associate Professor in Obstetrics and Gynecology and Director of Community Programs and Health Effectiveness at Wayne State University School of Medicine for 9 years;

He was a National Institutes of Health (NIH) and National Science Foundation (NSF) funded researcher with publications, including books, on topics related to healthcare management, quality, pregnancy outcome disparities, and women’s health. His most recent book was released in 2019 and is titled"The Healthcare Quality Book: Vision, Strategy and Tools.".

He is a Distinguished Fellow and a past President of the American College of Physician Executives (FACPE).  He is a Fellow in several professional organizations including the American College of Obstetricians and Gynecologists (FACOG), American College of Surgeons (FACS), and American College of Healthcare Executives (FACHE).  He is board certified by the American Board of Obstetrics and Gynecology, American Board of Medical Management, and Certifying Commission in Medical Management].

He has received numerous awards for research and recognized as a "Young Up and Coming Star" in healthcare management by Modern Healthcare magazine and Witt/Kieffer in 2000.  He was awarded the rank of Eagle Scout and has served on the Board of Directors for the Boy Scout Foundation of the Longhorn Council since 2007.  He currently serves as the Chairman of the Board of goldieglow LLC and serves of the Alumni Board of Governors of the University of Michigan Ross School of Business in Ann Arbor.

Education
Scott holds a M.P.H.  in clinical effectiveness from Harvard University School of Public Health, a M.B.A. from University of Michigan Ross School of Business, completed residency in Obstetrics and Gynecology from Beaumont Hospital in Dearborn Michigan/affiliated with the University of Michigan, and graduated with a Doctor of Osteopathic Medicine degree (D.O.) from Kansas City University.  He earned a B.A. in chemistry from Pacific Lutheran University and is a graduate of the U.S. Marine Corps Officer Candidate School.

Selected publications
Books
 Ransom SB, McNeeley SG.  Gynecology For The Primary Care Provider. Philadelphia: W.B. Saunders Company, publisher, 1997.
 Ransom SB, Pinsky W. Clinical Resource and Quality Management. Tampa: American College of Physician Executives, publisher, 1999.
 Ransom SB, McNeeley SG, Munkarah AR, Dombrowski MP, Moghissi KS. Practical Strategies in Obstetrics and Gynecology. Philadelphia: W.B. Saunders Company, publisher, 2000.
 Ransom SB, Tropman J, Pinsky WW. Advanced Principles of Medical Management: Enhancing Physician Performance. Tampa: American College of Physician Executive, publisher, 2000.
 Ransom SB, Dombrowski MP, Ginsberg K, Evans MP. Contemporary Therapy in Obstetrics and Gynecology. Philadelphia: W.B. Saunders, publisher, 2002.
 Ransom SB. The Wisdom of Top Healthcare CEOs. Tampa: American College of Physician Executives, publisher, 2003.
 Ransom SB, Joshi M, Nash D. The Healthcare Quality Book: Vision, Strategy and Tools. (first edition), Chicago: Health Administration Press, 2005.
 Ransom E, Joshi M, Nash D, Ransom SB. The Healthcare Quality Book: Vision, Strategy and Tools. (second edition), Chicago: Health Administration Press, 2008.
 Joshi M, Ransom E, Nash D, Ransom SB. The Healthcare Quality Book: Vision, Strategy and Tools. (third edition), Chicago: Health Administration Press, 2014.
 Nash D, Joshi M, Ransom E, Ransom SB. The Healthcare Quality Book: Vision, Strategy and Tools. (fourth edition), Chicago: Health Administration Press, 2019.
 Joshi M, Ransom SB, Ransom E, Nash D.  The Healthcare Quality Book: Vision, Strategy and Tools.(fifth edition), Chicago: Health Administration Press, 2023 (to be released Jan 2023).

Articles

 Ransom SB, McNeeley SG, Hosseini RB.  The cost effectiveness of routine type and screen determination before elective laparoscopy.  Obstet Gynecol 86(3):346-8,1995.
 Ransom SB, McNeeley SG, Doot G, Cotton D.  The effect of capitated and fee-for-service remuneration on physician decision making in gynecology.  Obstet Gynecol 87(5):707-10, 1996.
 Ransom SB, Dombrowski MP, Shephard R, Leonardi M. The economic cost of the medical-legal tort system. Am J Obstet Gynecol 174(6):1903-9, 1996.
 Ransom SB, McNeeley SG, Malone JM. A cost-effectiveness evaluation of preoperative type and screen testing for vaginal hysterectomy. Am J Obstet Gynecol 175(5):1201-6, 1996.
 Ransom SB, White C, McNeeley SG, Diamond MP. A cost analysis of endometrial ablation, abdominal hysterectomy, vaginal hysterectomy, and laparoscopic-assisted vaginal hysterectomy in the treatment of primary menorrhagia.  J Amer Assoc Gynecol Laparosc 4(1):29-34, 1996.
 Ransom SB, McNeeley SG, White C, Diamond MP. A cost-effectiveness evaluation of laparoscopic disposable verses nondisposable infraumbilical trocars.  J Amer Assoc Gynecol Laparosc 4(1):25-9, 1996.
 Ransom SB, Gell JW, Harrison M, McDonald FD. Implementation of a Clinical Pathway for Cesarean Section.  Am J Man Care 2(10):1374-9, 1996.
 Ransom SB, Gell JW, Harrison M, McDonald FD.  Gynecologists make hysterectomy (DRG 359) clinical pathways work. Journal of Pelvic Surgery. 4(3):109-114, 1998.
 Ransom SB, McNeeley SG, Yono A, Ettlie J, Dombrowski MP. The development and implementation of normal vaginal delivery clinical pathways in a large multihospital health system.  Am J Man Care. 4(4):723-7, 1998.
 Ransom SB, Moldenhaurer J. Diagnosis and management of PMS.  The Physician and Sportsmedicine. 26(4):35-43, 1998.
 Ransom SB. An information system model for negotiation of capitation contracts. Physician Executive 24(3):38-41, 1998.
 McNeeley SG, Hendrix SL, Mazzoni M, Kmak DC, Ransom SB. Medically sound, cost-effective treatment for pelvic inflammatory disease and tuboovarian abscess. Am J Obstet Gynecol 178: 1272-8, 1998.
 McNeeley SG, Hendrix SL, Bennet S, Singh A., Ransom SB.  Synthetic graft placement in the treatment of fascial dehiscence with necrosis and infection.  Am J Obstet Gynecol 179:1430-5, 1998. 
 Ransom SB, Fundara G, Dombrowski, MP.  The cost-effectiveness of routine type and screen testing for expected vaginal delivery. Obstet Gynecol 92:493-5, 1998.
 Ransom SB. Managed Care and Outcomes in Surgical Practice. Journal of Pelvic Surgery, 5(2):301-2, 1999.
 McComish JF, Greenberg R, Bryant JK, Chruscial HL, Ransom SB.  Effectiveness of a grief group for women in residential substance abuse treatment.  Substance Abuse 20(1):41-54, 1999.
 Ransom SB, Greenberg R, McComish J, Tolford D.  Oral metronidazole vs. Metrogel Vaginal for treating bacterial vaginosis: A cost-effectiveness evaluation. J Reprod Med 44:359-362, 1999.
 Ransom SB, Fundara G, Dombrowski MP.  Cost-effectiveness of routine blood type and screen testing for cesarean section  J Reprod Med 44(7):592-4, 1999.
 Downing S, Ransom SB.  Development and Implementation of clinical pathways with Activity Based Costing.  Physician Executive, 26(1): 9-11, April 2000.
 Ransom SB, Tropman JE.  The development of an Academic Faculty Practice Compensation Program Using Activity Based Costing. Physician Executive 26(3):17-8, May 2000. 
 Miller V, Ransom SB, Shalhoub A, Sokol RJ, Evans MP. Multifetal Pregnancy Reduction: Perinatal and Fiscal Outcomes. Am J Obstet Gynecol, 182(6):1575-80, 2000.
 Ransom SB, Dombrowski MP, Studdert D, Mello M, Brennan TA.  Reduced Medico-Legal Risk By Compliance With Obstetrical Clinical Pathways: A Case-Control Study. Obstet Gynecol, 101(4):751-5, 2003.
 Ransom SB. CQO role offers broad leadership challenges.  Physician Executive Journal, 29(4):65-7, Jul/Aug, 2003.
 Ransom SB. Six Keys to Weighing Probability and Achieving Organizational Improvements. Physician Executive Journal, 30(2): 64-67, Mar/Apr 2004.
 Robinson P, Xu X, Keeton K, Fenner D, Johnson T, Ransom SB.  The impact of medical-legal risk on obstetrician-gynecologist supply.  Obstetrics and Gynecology 105: 1296-1302, 2005.
 Chang T, Liang J, Ransom SB.  How Taiwan does it: Seeing more patients for less.  Physician Executive Journal 31(4): 38-42, 2005.
 Cazan-London G, Mozurkewich E, Xu X, Ransom SB.  Willingness or unwillingness to perform cesarean section for impending preterm delivery at 24 weeks gestation: A cost-effectiveness analysis. Am J Obstet Gynecol, 193: 1187-92, 2005.
 Ransom SB, Jessica, Schultz C, Anderson E, Xu X, Siefert K, Villarruel A.  Interdisciplinary solutions to medical conditions leading to birth outcome disparities for African American women.  African American Research Perspectives, 11(1): 1-16, 2005.
 Yakel B, Ford B, Anderson E, Ransom SB. Improving African American Birth Outcomes by Understanding Information Seeking Processes.  African American Research Perspectives, 11(1): 31-47, 2005.
 Ford B, Villarruel A, Anderson E, Ransom SB, Siefert K.  The life course of African American women and their relationships to providers: perceived discrimination leading to birth outcome disparities.  African American Research Perspectives, 11(1): 48-64, 2005.
 Wooten L, Schultz C, Anderson E, Yakel B, Siefert K, Ransom SB. Leadership policies that impact birth outcome disparities.  African American Research Perspectives, 11(1): 17-30, 2005.
 Patel D, Xu X, Thompson A, Ransom SB, Ivy J, Delancy J.  Childbirth and pelvic floor dysfunction: An epidemiologic approach to the assessment of prevention opportunities at delivery. Am J Obstet Gynecol, 195(1):23-8, 2006.
 Xu X, Patel D, Vahratian A, Ransom SB. Insurance Coverage and Health Care among Near-Elderly Women.  Women’s Health Issues, 16(3):139-48, May–June, 2006. 
 Xu X, Vahratian A, Patel DA, McRee A, Ransom S. Emergency contraception provision: a survey of Michigan physicians from five medical specialties. Journal of Women’s Health 16(4):489-498, 2007.
 Advincula AP, Xu X, Goudeau S, Ransom SB. Robot-assisted laparoscopic myomectomy versus abdominal myomectomy: A comparison of surgical outcomes and costs. J Minim Invasive Gynecol. 14(6):698-705, Nov/Dec 2007.
 Xu X, Siefert KA, Jacobson PD, Lori JR, Ransom SB. The effects of medical liability on obstetric care supply in Michigan. Amer J Obstet Gynecol, 198(2):205.e1-9, 2008.
 Xu X, Lori JR, Siefert KA, Jacobson PD, Ransom SB. Malpractice liability burden in midwifery: A survey of Michigan certified nurse-midwives.  Journal of Midwifery & Women’s Health, 53(1):19-27, 2008.
 Padmanabhan V, Siefert K, Ransom S, Johnson T, Pinkerton J, Anderson L, Kannan K.  Maternal bisphenol-A levels at delivery: a looming problem?  J Perinatology, 28(4):258-63, 2008,
 Xu X, Siefert K, Jacobson P, Lori J, Ransom S.  The impact of malpractice burden on Michigan obstetrician-gynecologists’ career satisfaction. Women’s Health Issues, 18(4):229-37, 2008.
 Maillert LM, Ivy JS, Ransom SB, Diehl K.  Assessing Dynamic Breast Cancer Screening Policies.  Operations Research 56(6):1411-1427, 2008.
 Xu X, Lori J, Siefert K, Jacobson P, Lori JR, Gueorguieva I, Ransom S.  Malpractice burden, rural location and discontinuation of obstetric care: A study of obstetric providers in Michigan.  The Journal of Rural Health, 25(1):33-42, 2009.
 Xu X, Grigorescu V, Siefert KA, Lori JR, Ransom SB.  Cost of Racial Disparity in Preterm Birth: Evidence from Michigan.  Journal of Health Care for the Poor and Underserved, 20(3):729-47, 2009.
 Xu X, Ivy JS, Patel DA, Patel SN, Smith DG, Ransom SB, Fenner D, Delancey JOL.  Pelvic floor consequences of cesarean delivery on maternal request in women with a single birth: a cost-effectiveness analysis, J Women’s Health, 19(1):147-60, 2010.
 Goldsmith J, Ransom S.  The governance challenge in hospital turnaround and transformation. The Governance Institute, 15(3), May 2018.

References

External links
The Healthcare Quality Book: Vision, Strategy, and Tools, 4th edition, 2019, Health Administration Press, https://www.ache.org/learning-center/publications/books/2382   
NIH Roadmap Grant--Health Disparities: Leaders, Providers and Patients,  www.med.umich.edu/OBGYN/research/hsr/roadmap/index.htm

Living people
Harvard School of Public Health alumni
Ross School of Business alumni
1962 births
Presidents of the University of North Texas Health Science Center
American chief executives
American osteopathic physicians